Carving is the act of using tools to shape something from a material by scraping away portions of that material. The technique can be applied to any material that is solid enough to hold a form even when pieces have been removed from it, and yet soft enough for portions to be scraped away with available tools. Carving, as a means for making stone or wooden sculpture, is distinct from methods using soft and malleable materials like clay, fruit, and melted glass, which may be shaped into the desired forms while soft and then harden into that form. Carving tends to require much more work than methods using malleable materials.

Kinds of carving include:

 Bone carving
 Chip carving
 Fruit carving
 Gourd carving or gourd art
 Ice carving or ice sculpture
 Ivory carving
 Stone carving
 Petroglyph

 Vegetable carving
Thaeng yuak (Banana stalk carving)
 Wood carving
 Hobo nickel
 Tree carving
 Arborglyph

See also
Engraving
Sculpture
Whittling

References

External links

 
The arts